Hiduj District is a district (bakhsh) in Sib and Suran County, Sistan and Baluchestan province, Iran. At the 2006 census, its population was 16,743, in 3,630 families. The district has one city: Hiduj. The district has two rural districts (dehestan): Hiduj Rural District and Kont Rural District.

References 

Sib and Suran County
Districts of Sistan and Baluchestan Province